David Kris Haines (born July 23, 1957) is a former American football wide receiver in the National Football League (NFL) for the Washington Redskins, the Chicago Bears, and the Buffalo Bills.  He played college football at the University of Notre Dame and was drafted in the ninth round of the 1979 NFL Draft. He also played for the Chicago Blitz of the United States Football League (USFL) in 1984. He was special teams coach of the Chicago Enforcers of the XFL.

Haines is a Physical Education teacher, Athletic coach, and Karate instructor at The Catherine Cook School in Chicago, Illinois. He is now a gym teacher.

Statistics

References

1957 births
Living people
American football wide receivers
Buffalo Bills players
Chicago Bears players
Notre Dame Fighting Irish football players
Washington Redskins players
Chicago Enforcers coaches
Players of American football from Akron, Ohio